Powerball is a lottery operated by Tatts Group under the master brand,  the Lott and its licensed subsidiaries including New South Wales Lotteries in New South Wales and the Australian Capital Territory, Tattersalls in Victoria and Tasmania, Golden Casket in Queensland, and South Australian Lotteries in South Australia. The Government owned Lotterywest operates the lottery in Western Australia.

The highest Australian Powerball jackpot was A$160 million on 27th October 2022. Most jackpot wins are not shared by multiple tickets. In Australia, a minimum of three numbers are needed, those being two regular numbers plus the Powerball. Australian winners always collect in lump sum parimutuel winnings.

The game was first revamped on 1 March 2013; drawing six regular numbers from 40 balls plus a Powerball using 20 balls. This also allowed the introduction of an 8th prize Division (two main numbers plus the Powerball). Other changes include an increase of 10c per play, and the introduction of an option (QuickHit40) which will "wheel" the 40 Powerballs although not guaranteeing a prize.

The current Powerball format was introduced on 19 April 2018, using two Smartplay Halogen II draw machines with the intention of offering bigger jackpots and creating more overall winners. In each draw, seven regular numbers are selected from a pool of 35, while the additional Powerball continues to be drawn from a separate pool of 20 balls. A new, 9th Prize Division was added. To enable the new format, the cost of Powerball entries was increased.

Records

On 1 March 2007, the Division 1 pool was $33 million; it was the largest Australian lottery prize won.

On 5 June 2008, the Division 1 pool was $58,737,207.41; then the largest prize pool in Australian history to that point (since eclipsed several times, including by Oz Lotto in 2012 , which had a Division 1 pool of $100 million.) 

On 30 July 2009, the Division 1 pool was $80 million, the largest Australian Powerball pool until August 2018. There were two Division 1 winners in the drawing.

On 21 August 2014, the Division 1 pool was $70 million. Two winners walked away with 35 million each.

On 28 May 2015, the Division 1 pool was $50 million, won by a single ticket. The winner was a woman from Canberra.

On 23 July 2015, the Division 1 pool was $50 million, won by a single ticket. The winner was a woman from Western Australia.

On 7 January 2016, the Division 1 pool was $70 million, won by a single ticket. The winner was from Queensland.

On 11 January 2018, the Division 1 pool was $55 million, won by a single ticket in the Melbourne town of Brunswick. The prize went unclaimed for almost six months but was finally claimed anonymously just seven days before it was set to be transferred to the Victorian State Revenue Office. In Victoria, the amount of time someone has to claim a prize is unlimited, however if it is not claimed within six months, it will go to the Victorian State Revenue Office where the winner can claim it at any time. 

On 16 August 2018, the Division 1 pool was $100 million, surpassing the previous record for Powerball and equalling the Oz Lotto record. The Division 1 pool was split between two winners, one from Melbourne, one from Sydney. On 17 January 2019, a single person from Sydney won $107 million, making it the largest individual lottery win in Australian history. 

As of 18 July 2019, the Division 1 prize is $110 million. It was the largest ever division one prize, in Australia's history. 

No one won the $100 million jackpot on 12 September 2019, thus it went up to $150 million on the 19th. It was shared by three winners, winning $50 million each.

As of 27 October 2022, the highest Division 1 prize is $160 million. It is currently the largest ever Division 1 prize in Australia lotto history.

Original Odds: 5/45 Regular Balls, 1/45 Powerball (prior to March 2013)

Odds: 6/40 Regular Balls, 1/20 Powerball (prior to 13 April 2018)

New Odds: 7/35 Regular Balls, 1/20 Powerball (from 13 April 2018)

See also

Lotteries in Australia

References

Lotteries in Australia